Beauty and the Beast is the cast album performed by the original Broadway cast members from the 1994 Disney stage musical Beauty and the Beast, with music by Alan Menken, lyrics by Howard Ashman and Tim Rice, and a book by Linda Woolverton. It is adapted from Walt Disney Pictures' 1991 animated musical film of the same name, which in turn had been based on the classic French fairy tale by Jeanne-Marie Leprince de Beaumont. The cast album was released in CD, vinyl and cassettes, and further re-issued in digital formats in 1999.

Background 

Eight of the film's original songs that were retained for the Broadway adaptation. Menken, who had both scored and written the film's songs alongside lyricist Ashman, returned to the project to write six new songs for the musical; those were co-written by Tim Rice, replacing Ashman who had died in 1991, before the film was released. The album featured much of the musical numbers, and alternate versions of the songs. The new musical tracks, include "Human Again", which had originally been written for the film, but ultimately abandoned due to time and story constraints; this number was featured in the 2002 special edition of the film. The track "A Change in Me" was written for specifically for R&B singer Toni Braxton, when she joined the Broadway production to play Belle in 1998. This track was however, not included in the Broadway or of the subsequent cast recordings. However, Susan Egan who played Belle had included it in her 2002 album So Far....

Reception 
Peter Fawthrop of AllMusic summarized, "There may not have been reason to own the Broadway Cast Recording, aside from being a fan of Susan Egan's (voice of Belle), if not for these extra songs. Each one could have fit in perfectly with the film — they aren't simply shoveled in as bonuses, but make the whole picture bigger and fuller. Every major character has their own new song, the standout being "Home," which is sung by Belle upon arriving at the Beast's castle. "Me," sung by the handsome and evil Gaston, is a boisterous love song to himself, stuffed with witty lines like "women can have their uses too/mainly to extend the family tree." Even the Beast has his solo moment with the dark, mournful ballad "If I Can't Love Her." The household objects who gave Disney World a new theme of "Be Our Guest," reveal their longings to return to human form in "Human Again," the only new song which was written by Howard Ashman. There is something for all fans here, even those who prefer the clear-cut original versions and voices from the animated film."

Track listing

Personnel 
Credits adapted from CD liner notes.

 Cast
 Narrator – David Ogden Stiers
 Belle – Susan Egan
 Beast – Terrence Mann
 Gaston – Burke Moses
 LeFou – Kenny Raskin
 Lumière – Gary Beach
 Mrs. Potts – Beth Fowler
 Cogsworth – Heath Lamberts
 Maurice – Tom Bosley
 Babette – Stacey Logan
 Chip – Brian Press
 Monsieur D'Arque – Gordon Stanley
 Ensemble cast
 Alisa Klein
 Anna McNeeley
 Barbara Marineau
 Bill Nabel
 Dan Mojica
 David Elder
 Elmore James
 Gordon Stanley
 Gregorey Garrison
 Harrison Beal
 Jack Hayes
 Joan Barber
 Joanne McHugh
 Kate Dowe
 Kim Huber
 Linda Talcott
 Merwin Foard
 Michael Demby-Cain
 Paige Price
 Patrick Loy
 Rob Lorey
 Sarah Solie Shannon
 Vince Pesce
 Wysandria Woolsey 
 Production
 Music production – Alan Menken, Bruce Botnick
 Recording, editing and mixing – Bruce Botnick
 Programming – Daniel Tramon
 Score arrangement – Michael Kosarin
 Incidental music arrangement and supervision – David Friedman
 Album co-ordinator – Janet Weber
 Instruments
 Accordion – Dominic Cortese
 Bass – Jeff Carney
 Bass clarinet – Alva Hunt
 Bassoon and contrabassoon – Marc Goldberg
 Cello – Barry Fincklair, Caryl Paisner, Frederick Zlotkin, Gerald Tarack, Joe Kimura, Maria Kitsopoulos
 Clarinet – Alva Hunt, Kari Ann DiBari
 Drums – John Redsecker
 Flute – Alva Hunt, Kari Ann DiBari, Julius Baker
 French horn – Glen Estrin, Jeff Lang, Tony Cecere
 Harp – Stacey Shames
 Harpsichord – Gerry Ranck, Ken Cooper
 Oboe and English horn – Vicki Bodner
 Percussion – Joe Passaro
 Piccolo flute – Alva Hunt, Julius Baker
 Piccolo trumpet – Tony Kadleck
 Synthesizer – Glen Kelly, Kathy Sommer
 Trumpet and cornet – Neal Balm, Tony Kadleck
 Tuba and bass trombone – Paul Falise
 Violin – Ann Labin, Belinda Whitney, Cenovia Cummins, Evan Johnson, George Wozniak, Rudy Perrault
 Orchestra
 Orchestration – Danny Troob
 Additional orchestration – Michael Starobin
 Conductor – Michael Kosarin
 Associate conductor – Kathy Sommer
 Orchestra contractor – John Miller
 Copyist – Peter R. Miller

Certifications

References 

1994 soundtrack albums
Cast recordings
Theatre soundtracks
Pop soundtracks
Beauty and the Beast (franchise)
Walt Disney Records soundtracks
Alan Menken soundtracks
Howard Ashman soundtracks
Tim Rice albums
Albums produced by Alan Menken
Albums produced by Howard Ashman
Albums produced by Tim Rice